India on Four Wheels is a documentary shown in the UK on BBC Two where Justin Rowlatt and Anita Rani travel around India sampling the changes and problems that growing car usage has brought to the country in the last two decades.

The show was first broadcast on Friday 19 August and Friday 26 August 2011 as a two-part series. The programme was shown at 9pm and on BBC Two and BBC HD.
The presenters, Justin Rowlatt and Anita Rani travelled on two different journeys. Rani travelled in a modern, small 4x4 representing India's car economy of today, whereas Rowlatt travelled in an older Indian car visiting many places where people didn't have a car, or where they were only just discovering them.

These were the ratings for the two episodes:

See also
Automotive industry in India

References

External links
 

2011 British television series debuts
2011 British television series endings
BBC high definition shows
BBC television documentaries
British television miniseries
English-language television shows
Television shows set in India
Documentary films about India
Automotive industry in India